Ramesh Ponnuru (born August 16, 1974) is an American conservative thinker, political pundit, and journalist. He is a senior fellow at the American Enterprise Institute since 2012. He is the editor of National Review magazine, a contributing columnist for The Washington Post, and a contributing editor to the domestic policy journal National Affairs.

Ponnuru has written on a wide array of political and policy topics, appeared on numerous public affairs and news interview programs, reflecting his widely respected voice on conservative policy. In 2015, Politico Magazine listed both him and his wife, April Ponnuru, as two of the top "Politico 50" influential leaders in American politics. This was the first and only time that a husband and wife appeared on the list at the same time.

Early life and education 
Ponnuru was raised in Prairie Village, Kansas, a suburb of Kansas City, MO, where he attended Briarwood Elementary School (Prairie Village, Kansas)  and Mission Valley Middle School. After graduating from Shawnee Mission East High School, at the age of 16, he then went on to attend Princeton University, where he earned a B.A. in history and graduated summa cum laude in 1995. He completed a 107-page long senior thesis, titled "Abortion in Nineteenth-Century America, in Brief", under the supervision of Robert P. George. Raised by a Hindu father and a Lutheran mother, Ponnuru is of Asian Indian descent. Later in life, Ponnuru, once an agnostic converted to Catholicism. He is married to April Ponnuru.

Career

Journalism
Since 1999, Ponnuru has been either a senior fellow or senior editor, or both at the same time, at National Review, where he has frequently written and commented on such diverse topics as politics, public policy, economics, the law, and even his religious faith. In its pages, he has become widely recognized for calling for a revival of Republican policy thinking by applying conservative ideals to contemporary problems and emphasizing the concerns of the middle class.

Ponnuru has long been one of the nation's leading conservative voices in making the case for increasing the child tax credit to properly compensate parents for the cost of raising children, and won praise for finding common ground with progressives and Democrats on the issue. He has also been a regular co-author and leading voice with economist David Beckworth on the topic of monetary policy and market monetarism.

Ponnuru has frequently appeared on a diverse array of television programs about public affairs, among them Meet the Press, Face the Nation, C-Span, the PBS NewsHour, National Public Radio's All Things Considered, ABC News' This Week with George Stephanopoulos, ABC News. The Daily Show (which at the time was hosted by Jon Stewart), and The Colbert Report.

He has also been a regular guest speaker on policy, politics, and constitutionalism at several of the nation's leading college campuses, In 2013, he was a fellow at the University of Chicago’s Institute of Politics. The Institute's website has described "the Fellows" as "a dynamic and distinguished group of political practitioners and journalists who will lead seminars and interact with UChicago students and faculty."

In 2006, Ponnuru wrote The Party of Death: The Democrats, the Media, the Courts, and the Disregard for Human Life.
Provocatively titled on purpose, Ponnuru himself has explained, the volume is Ponnuru's unique and provocative exposition on such right to life issues as abortion and euthanasia, concentrating on the circumstances of the United States Democratic Party's shift from anti-abortion to abortion rights.  The book was met with acclaim and near universal favorable reviews, despite the fact that the subject has been one of the most polarizing issues of American political life. Peggy Noonan celebrated the book as "the most significant statement of the need to protect human life in America since Ronald Reagan's Abortion and the Conscience of a Nation".

National Review Online Editor at Large Jonah Goldberg, wrote of the book: "Ponnuru scrupulously sticks to nonreligious arguments, accessible to everyone. But that hasn't stopped critics from charging that his motives are unacceptably 'religious,' while others have complained Ponnuru is too coldly rational. Again it seems Ponnuru's real sin isn't how he says things, but that he says them at all."

John Derbyshire wrote in The New English Review: "RTL is made as presentable as possible in Party of Death, with writing that is engaging and lucid.... (Right to Lifers) are welcoming Party of Death very joyfully, though, and they are right to do so, as it is an exceptionally fine piece of polemical writing in support of their... cause.... Party of Death is obviously inspired by religious belief. The philosophical passages strictly follow the Golden Rule of religious apologetics, which is: The conclusion is known in advance, and the task of the intellectual is to erect supporting arguments."

In a sharp, but measured response to accusations that Ponnuru had an overtly religious viewpoint in approaching the abortion issue, he forcefully addressed the issue himself head on: "I have made a show of reasoning, but my conclusions have all rather conveniently lined up with the teachings of my church.... For the record, my views on abortion have not changed since I was an agnostic.... It is true that I am a Catholic. It is also true that I believe that my church's teaching on abortion is reasonable, sound, and correct. It is because I came to believe that Catholicism is true, after all, that I became a Catholic. If I didn't believe Catholic teachings were true, I wouldn't be a Catholic."

Ponnuru has also been the author of a highly influential monograph on Japanese industrial policy, published jointly by the American Enterprise Institute and Center for Policy Studies.

Ponnuru is a past contributor to Time and WashingtonPost.com. He has also written for other such national publications as The New York Times, The Washington Post, The Wall Street Journal, Financial Times, Newsday, New York Post, The Weekly Standard, Policy Review, The New Republic, and First Things,
an ecumenical and conservative religious journal.

Policy
Ponnuru has long been a much sought after speaker on conservative domestic policy and their political implications; he has regularly been a featured guest at retreats for congressional Republicans, including the party's leadership.

Ponnuru has often been identified as a leader of the "reform conservative" movement, and was prominently featured in a 2014 New York Times Magazine cover story as one of the foremost conservative intellectuals who comprise it. The Times''' Sam Tanenhaus described Ponnuro as one of a small group of young conservative Republicans, who, each one, "was an intellectual prodigy in his 30s" who together had "become the leaders of a small band of reform conservatives, sometimes called reformicons, who believe the health of the G.O.P. hinges on jettisoning its age-old doctrine — orgiastic tax-cutting, the slashing of government programs, the championing of Wall Street — and using an altogether different vocabulary, backed by specific proposals, that will reconnect the party to middle-class and low-income voters."

In 2014, Ponnuru co-edited, with Yuval Levin, Room to Grow: Conservative Reforms for a Limited Government and a Thriving Middle Class, described as a reform conservative manifesto and policy agenda. (Ponnuru also contributed the book's concluding chapter, on constitutionalism.) The book was widely praised; New York Times columnist David Brooks described it as a "policy-laden manifesto... which is the most coherent and compelling policy agenda the American right has produced this century."

Ponnuru's collaboration with Levin also won widespread praise for both men because of Levin's own high standing in the conservative movement and the prescient observations of both: Levin has been called "probably the most influential conservative intellectual of the Obama era" by Jonathan Chait of New York Magazine, while the left-leaning The New Republic has described Levin as "the conservative movement's great intellectual hope" and has said that "despite his youth, Levin had been anointed the next great neoconservative."

 Books 
 Ponnuru, Ramesh (2006). The Party of Death: The Democrats, the Media, the Courts, and the Disregard for Human Life''.  Regnery Publishing.  . Description and contents, using up/down arrows.

References

External links
 National Review biography and archive
 AEI fellow page
 Bloomberg View column archive
 Video debates featuring Ponnuru on Bloggingheads.tv
 

1974 births
Living people
People from Prairie Village, Kansas
American columnists
American male journalists
American writers of Indian descent
American people of Telugu descent
Converts to Roman Catholicism from atheism or agnosticism
Writers from Missouri
Princeton University alumni
Roman Catholic writers
Journalists from Washington, D.C.
National Review people
Writers from Kansas
Catholics from Kansas